Sant Prabhuduttji Brahmachari was an Indian  from Vrindavan(Bansivat) and  who ran a Sanskrit school in Basant gaon, New Delhi. He founded his ashram at Jhusi to organize Kumbh Mela. He became close to Golwalker in nearly 1950 and then Rajendra Singh and Golwalker persuaded him to stand against Nehru on the cow protection platform and against the Hindu Code Bill. In 1951, he openly challenged Jawaharlal Nehru's election to the 1st Lok Sabha from the Phulpur (Lok Sabha constituency), challenging Nehru's stance on the ideology of Hinduism in independent India.

References

20th-century Hindu religious leaders
Year of birth missing
Year of death missing